In mathematics, the genus is a classification of quadratic forms and lattices over the ring of integers. An integral quadratic form is a quadratic form on Zn, or equivalently a free Z-module of finite rank.  Two such forms are in the same genus if they are equivalent over the local rings Zp for each prime p and also equivalent over R.

Equivalent forms are in the same genus, but the converse does not hold.  For example, x2 + 82y2 and 2x2 + 41y2 are in the same genus but not equivalent over Z. Forms in the same genus have equal discriminant and hence there are only finitely many equivalence classes in a genus.

The Smith–Minkowski–Siegel mass formula gives the weight or mass of the quadratic forms in a genus, the count of equivalence classes weighted by the reciprocals of the orders of their automorphism groups.

Binary quadratic forms
For binary quadratic forms there is a group structure on the set C of equivalence classes of forms with given discriminant.  The genera are defined by the generic characters.  The principal genus, the genus containing the principal form, is precisely the subgroup C2 and the genera are the cosets of C2: so in this case all genera contain the same number of classes of forms.

See also
 Spinor genus

References

External links
 

Quadratic forms